Bung Khla is a tambon (subdistrict) of Bung Khla District, in Bueng Kan Province, Thailand. In 2020 it had a total population of 5,216 people.

History
The subdistrict was created effective July 1, 1990 by splitting off 9 administrative villages from Nong Doen.

Administration

Central administration
The tambon is subdivided into 9 administrative villages (muban).

Local administration
The whole area of the subdistrict is covered by the subdistrict administrative organization (SAO) Bung Khla (องค์การบริหารส่วนตำบลบุ่งคล้า).

References

External links
Thaitambon.com on Bung Khla

Tambon of Bueng Kan province
Populated places in Bueng Kan province